The 2018–19 season was Real Club Deportivo Mallorca's 84th season in existence and the club's 1st season back in the second division of Spanish football. In addition to the domestic league, RCD Mallorca participated in this season's edition of the Copa del Rey. The season covers the period from 1 July 2018 to 30 June 2019.

Players

Current squad

Out on loan

Pre-season and friendlies

Competitions

Overview

Segunda División

League table

Results summary

Results by round

Matches
The fixtures were revealed on 24 July 2018.

Copa del Rey

References

External links

RCD Mallorca seasons
RCD Mallorca